Tetilla is a regional cow's-milk cheese made in Galicia, in north-western Spain. It is a common element in Galician cuisine, often used as a dessert.

History 
Already in the 1st century AD 1 Plinio speaks of some tasty Gallaecia cheeses which he calls "mamulas lactem". However, there are theories that assure that this cheese comes from a convent of nuns from the 11th century, although what is clear is that Galicia has always been a cattle land and that the cowherds of the Rubia Gallega cow had enough milk for the cheese making. Tetilla, was typical of the eastern part of A Coruña, which bordered with Lugo, in the municipalities of Curtis, Arzúa and Melide. With the cheese festival, this type of cheese, like other types of Galicia, have been gaining strength and prominence. The history of this cheese coincides with that of A Ulloa.

It has had Denominación de Origen certification since 1993 and European DOP certification since 1996. It is the most traditional cheese consumed in Galicia, although it is also known and appreciated in the rest of Spain. According to Tetilla Cheese´s Regulatory Council (C.R.D.O.P. “Queixo Tetilla), about 2 million units of Tetilla cheese are produced annually. The highest volume was produced in 2010 with 2,8 million units.

Features 
It was originally produced in small towns such as Arzúa, Melide, Curtis or Sobrado dos Monxes, near the border between the provinces of A Coruña and Pontevedra; it is now produced throughout Galicia. It is made with milk from three breeds of cattle: imported Friesian and Parda Alpina (Braunvieh), and the local Rubia Gallega of Galicia.

The name tetilla (Spanish for small breast; the word is also the official name in Galician) describes the shape of the cheese, a sort of cone topped by a nipple, or a half pear – hence its other name, perilla.

This cheese is matured between a minimum of 8 days and 30 days.

This cheese is soft, creamy, uniform, with few holes, ivory-white and yellowish in colour. It is very creamy in the mouth and has a very natural, milky, slightly acidulous and mildly salty flavour, suitable for all tastes. A cheese for daily and continuous consumption, at all times, with good culinary applications, especially for stuffing and breading, due to its melting character with a heat stroke. It can be accompanied by a glass of young red wine or an Albariño.

References

External links
 Queixo de Tetilla – Official site of the "Queixo Tetilla – Consello regulador Denominación de Orixe protexida Queixo Tetilla" (in Galician, Spanish, French and English)
 Tetilla cheese info at spanishclub.blog

Galician cuisine
Spanish cheeses
Spanish products with protected designation of origin
Cheeses with designation of origin protected in the European Union